Adhaesozetidae is a family of mites belonging to the order Sarcoptiformes.

Genera:
 Adhaesozetes Hammer, 1966  
 Bunabodes Fujikawa, 2004

References

Sarcoptiformes
Acari families